Shields is a resort village in the Canadian province of Saskatchewan within Census Division No. 11. It is on the shores of Blackstrap Lake in the Rural Municipality of Dundurn No. 314. It east of the town of Dundurn.

History
Shields incorporated as a resort village on January 1, 1981.

Sports and recreation
Shields is located on the north-western shore of Blackstrap Lake. There's boating, fishing, swimming, and other water sports. Shields also has a 9-hold golf course and is a short drive from Blackstrap Provincial Park, which is on the eastern side of the lake and features Mount Blackstrap, camping, picnicking, boating, and swimming. On the north-eastern shore of the lake is another golf course, Lakeside Golf Resort, which opened June 1, 2021. Lakeside Golf Resort is directly across from Shields.

Demographics

Government
The Resort Village of Shields is governed by an elected municipal council and an appointed administrator that meets on the third Monday of every month. The mayor is Eldon MacKay and its administrator is Jessie Williams.

See also
List of communities in Saskatchewan
List of municipalities in Saskatchewan
List of resort villages in Saskatchewan
List of villages in Saskatchewan
List of summer villages in Alberta

References

External links

Resort villages in Saskatchewan
Dundurn No. 314, Saskatchewan
Division No. 11, Saskatchewan